Chicago Democratic National Convention may refer to the following Democratic National Convention events:

1864 Democratic National Convention
1884 Democratic National Convention
1892 Democratic National Convention
1896 Democratic National Convention
1932 Democratic National Convention
1940 Democratic National Convention
1944 Democratic National Convention
1952 Democratic National Convention
1956 Democratic National Convention
1968 Democratic National Convention
1968 Democratic National Convention protest activity
1996 Democratic National Convention